"Shoulda Let You Go" is a song by American R&B singer Keyshia Cole. It was written by Cole and Rodney "Darkchild" Jerkins for her second studio album Just like You (2007), while production was helmed by Jerkins. The song features additional vocals by rapper Amina Harris. "Shoulda Let You Go" premiered on August 25, 2007, on V103, an Atlanta-based radio station, and was later released as the album's second single. It reached number 40 on the US Billboard Hot 100 and peaked at number six on the Hot R&B/Hip-Hop Songs.

Music video 
The video was shot in Miami and directed by Erik White. It premiered on BET's Access Granted on October 4, 2007. The video begins with Cole sleeping as we see roses and an answering machine showing that she has been given ten missed calls and twelve unread messages from her ex. It then shows Cole partying while interacting with her best friends. Scenes of her dancing in a bikini on a beach are shown in-between as well as Cole dancing with a bunch of male dancers. Rapper Amina makes an appearance in the video.

Track listings

Notes
  signifies vocal producer

Credits and personnel 
Credits adapted from the liner notes of Just like You.

Amina – vocals
Keyshia Cole – vocals, writer
Ron Fair – vocal producer
Rodney Jerkins – producer, writer
Dave Pensado – mixing engineer

Charts

Weekly charts

Year-end charts

References

2007 singles
Keyshia Cole songs
Song recordings produced by Rodney Jerkins
Songs written by Rodney Jerkins
2007 songs
Songs written by Keyshia Cole
de:Keyshia Cole
fr:Keyshia Cole